Kieran David Lloyd (born 13 October 2002) is an English professional footballer who plays as a right-back for EFL Championship  club Wigan Athletic.

Career
A youth product of Liverpool since the age of 8, Lloyd moved to the youth academy of Wigan Athletic in January 2019. On 30 June 2021, he signed his first professional contract with Wigan Athletic. He made his professional debut with Wigan in a 1–1 (7–8) EFL Cup penalty shootout win over Hull City on 10 August 2021.

In October 2021, he joined National League North side AFC Fylde on a short-term loan deal, where he linked up with former Latics U23 coach Nick Chadwick.

References

External links
 

2002 births
Living people
English footballers
Wigan Athletic F.C. players
AFC Fylde players
National League (English football) players
Association football fullbacks